The Rinspeed Yello Talbo is a Swiss sports car produced in association with Dieter Meier and Boris Blank of the eclectic electronic group Yello. It debuted at the Geneva Motor Show in 1996.

The car has nostalgic design cues, taking inspiration from designs of the late 1930s, and more specifically taking inspiration from a 1938 Talbot-Lago SS by Figoni & Falaschi. The Yello Talbo is powered by a supercharged 5.0L V8-engine producing  and coupled to an automatic gearbox. This allows it to accelerate from 0–100 km/h (0–62 mph) in 5.5 seconds.

External links 
 Rinspeed Yello Talbo
 https://www.gccarrossier.com/

Notes

Concept cars
Sports cars

Rinspeed vehicles
Retro-style automobiles
Cars introduced in 1996